Lazzaza (transliterated as Lazzâza) was a Palestinian Arab village of 230 in the northern Hula Valley next to the Hasbani River, located  northwest of Safad. Beit Hillel subsequently expanded onto the land.

History
In 1881, the PEF's Survey of Western Palestine (SWP)  described  Lazzaza, while under Ottoman rule, as a village of 70 people built of adobe bricks and situated on a plain near a river.

British Mandate era
It was incorporated into the British Mandate of Palestine in 1922. Under the British, Lazzaza had an elementary school, in which 26 students were enrolled in 1945. The residents, mostly Muslims, took advantage of the village's fertile lands, and agriculture became the basis of its economy. The primarily cultivated crops were onions, corn, and fruits, but the beehives were also kept, in addition to some livestock. Some of Lazzaza's inhabitants also fished in the Hasbani River.

In the 1931 census of Palestine the population of Lazaza was 176, all Muslims, in a total of 39 houses.

In the  1945 statistics, Lazzaza was counted with the nearby Jewish settlement of Beit Hillel which together constituted a population of 330; 230 were Muslims of Lazzaza, the remaining 100  were Jewish of Beit Hillel.

Types of land use in dunams in the village in 1945:

The land ownership of the village before occupation in dunams:

1948, aftermath
The Arabs of Lazzaza fled their village during the 1948 Arab-Israeli War on May 21, 1948. The village was not attacked by Israeli forces, and the probable cause of its depopulation was a "whispering campaign" devised by Palmach commander Yigal Allon during Operation Yiftach, in which rumor would spread about massive Jewish reinforcements approaching the Galilee. According to Walid Khalidi, "only a few scattered houses remain on the village site", and that the residents of Beit Hillel cultivate the surrounding fields.

See also
Depopulated Palestinian locations in Israel

References

Bibliography

  

  *

External links
Welcome to Lazzaza
Lazzaza, Zochrot
Lazzaza, Dr. Khalil Rizk.
Survey of Western Palestine, map 2:  IAA, Wikimedia commons
Lazzaza, from the Khalil Sakakini Cultural Center

Arab villages depopulated during the 1948 Arab–Israeli War
District of Safad